Broomfield Junction Halt railway station served the town of Montrose, Angus, Scotland from 1865 to 1877 on the Montrose and Bervie Railway.

History 
The station opened on 1 November 1865 by the Great North of Scotland Railway. It closed to both passengers and goods traffic in 1877.

References

External links 

 

Disused railway stations in Angus, Scotland
Former Great North of Scotland Railway stations
Railway stations in Great Britain opened in 1865
Railway stations in Great Britain closed in 1877
1865 establishments in Scotland
1877 disestablishments in Scotland
Montrose, Angus